Saúl Zamora Romero (born 26 March 2003) is a Mexican professional footballer who plays as a midfielder for Liga MX club León.

International career
Zamora was called up to the under-20 team by Luis Ernesto Pérez to participate at the 2021 Revelations Cup, appearing in one match, where Mexico won the competition. In June 2022, he was included in the under-20 squad, this time for the CONCACAF Under-20 Championship.

Career statistics

Club

Honours
León
Leagues Cup: 2021

Mexico U20
Revelations Cup: 2021, 2022

References

External links
Saúl Zamora Romero at Soccerway 
Saúl Zamora Romero at Football database

2003 births
Living people
Association football midfielders
Mexican footballers
Club León footballers
Liga MX players
Mexico under-20 international footballers